Franz Stoss (28 May 1909 – 21 June 1995) was an Austrian stage. film and television actor. He also worked as a theatre director. Following the Second World War he worked at the re-opened Vienna Burgtheater.

Selected filmography 
 Sarajevo (1955) 
 The Model Boy (1963)
 Condemned to Sin (1964)
 I Learned It from Father (1964)
 Trouble with Trixie (1972)
 Der Bockerer (1981)

References

Bibliography 
 Yates, W.E. Theatre in Vienna: A Critical History, 1776-1995. Cambridge University Press, 2005.

External links 
 
 Franz Stoß (in German) from the online-archive of the Österreichischen Mediathek

1909 births
1995 deaths
Austrian male film actors
Austrian male television actors
Austrian male stage actors
Male actors from Vienna
20th-century Austrian male actors
Commanders Crosses of the Order of Merit of the Federal Republic of Germany